Adam De La Cour (born 8 June 1979) is a British composer. He studied composition with Michael Finnissy at the University of Southampton where he gained his PhD in 2006.

Music

De La Cour is predominantly interested in absurdity and satire, often writing pieces that involve himself as performer/participant and often victim, such as in The Best of "Futility Music" – Volume 1, Batsu!!! Humiliating Music for Guitar and Corporate Talent Factor's Next Top Idol!™. De La Cour's music embraces a wide range of influences including video, elements of the New Complexity, free improvisation and heavy metal.

His music has been broadcast on BBC Radio 3, Resonance FM, Danmarks Radio and ABC Classic FM (Australia).

Performances

De La Cour is active as a vocalist, electric guitarist, and clown, performing works by Neil Luck, Michael Finnissy, Chris Newman, Matthew Shlomowitz, Alwynne Pritchard, Claudia Molitor, and Trond Reinholdtsen. De La Cour has performed Schoenberg's Pierrot Lunaire (voice) with Ensemble Reconsil, with past performances in Kazakhstan, Kyrgyzstan, and The Arnold Schoenberg Centre in Vienna.

Festivals De La Cour has been involved in include Latitude Festival/BBC Music Introducing stage, ISCM World Music Days, MATA Festival, Huddersfield Contemporary Music Festival, London Contemporary Music Festival, TRANSIT (Belgium), Borealis (Norway), Bergen International Festival and Melbourne Festival (Australia). De La Cour has performed with musicians such as Jane Manning, Mark Knoop, Lore Lixenberg, Linda Hirst, John Edwards, and Steve Noble, as well as ensembles such as the London Sinfonietta, Ensemble +-, and The Letter Piece Company. He also performs in the bands The Two Bennys, Arn & Hammer, and is a composer/performer for ARCO.

Video and visual work

De la Cour has collaborated with the artist Bruce McLean producing the film Drumstick, which has been exhibited at Ikon Gallery, Birmingham, Württembergischer Kunstverein Stuttgart, and as part of a live performance at the Whitechapel Gallery, London. De La Cour creates live performance pieces that include video scores.

squib-box

De La Cour is a founding member of squib-box, alongside Federico Reuben and Neil Luck. Squib-box is a cooperative and netlabel dedicated to the production and dissemination of radical and avant-garde music, regardless of its genre.

References

External links
 IMDB
 Classicalite interview

1979 births
Living people
British composers